The South-Western City School District is Ohio's sixth largest public school district located southwest of the city of Columbus. The district serves nearly 20,000 students throughout the southwest quadrant of Franklin County, including the cities of Galloway, Georgesville, Grove City, and Urbancrest. The district also serves all of Franklin, Jackson, Pleasant, and Prairie townships and a portion of Columbus.

The district operates fifteen elementary schools, five intermediate schools, five middle schools, four high schools, and a career academy.

History

Only one high school was in existence in the area now called the South-Western City School District in
1954. Six boards of education governed the individual school districts serving the area.
Population was growing rapidly then, as it has continued to do since. Schools were sorely pressed to meet
the needs.

Only the Franklin Local District had a financial base adequate to support the growing demands. That situation
came about because of the location of large industrial operations in the years just prior to 1936.
A committee of citizens representing the six districts was formed, and meetings were held with members of
the various boards of education, and with county and state officials.

On January 1, 1956, the South-Western Local School District was formed. It was a consolidation of five local
systems and one exempted village school system. These were: the Grove City-Jackson Exempted Village District,
the Franklin Township Local District, the Prairie Township Local District, the Pleasant Township Local District,
the Urbancrest Village District, and the Georgesville Local District.

The consolidation was planned for: economy of operation; expediency to provide an adequate education for
children of the area; opportunity because of the greater financial base of the newly combined school district;
and potential for support of a quality school system.

Immediately following the creation of the new district, an additional tax levy for operation expenses was
requested of voters and was approved. That same year, a bond issue to pay for construction of additional school
buildings was also requested of voters, and was approved.

The years from 1957 to 1960 were tumultuous
ones for the district. Population soared so that each
year more than 1,000 new students entered the
schools. This necessitated a huge financial outlay
for additional buildings, the employment of teachers
to staff the new classrooms, and the provision of
adequate services.

The tax duplicate of the district also grew rapidly
during these years, and fortunate it was, as the State
of Ohio's participation in financing education in
the district decreased from nearly 40 percent at the
beginning of the period to less than 30 percent of the
necessary costs by the end of the decade.
During the same period, bond issues and tax
levies requested of voters were not approved time
after time at the ballot. Costs soared as new students
continued to enroll in the district's schools.
As the area became more heavily populated,
Grove City changed from a village to a chartered city
in 1958. On August 19, 1959, the Board of Education
of South-Western Local Schools took action as
outlined in law to change the status of the school
system and the South-Western City School District
was established.

By this time, public sentiment was so aroused by
the obvious need of the schools that a major school
operating tax levy, and shortly thereafter a bond
issue for the construction of additional buildings,
was approved. At that point, the South-Western City
School District started to achieve a reputation as one
of Ohio's most outstanding school districts.
Continuously throughout the following seven
years improvements were made within the district.
Kindergarten and special programs began, vitally needed
counseling and psychological services were added, and a
technical and vocational program was greatly expanded.
Culminating the achievements during this period was
the building of the Paul C. Hayes Technical Training
Center.

Changes in laws governing state participation
in financing school districts brought a financial
squeeze in 1968. During that time, cutbacks in
personnel and services brought challenges to the
school district. Cutbacks continued in 1969 and 1970
as the percentage of state participation in financing
the South-Western City Schools continued to decline.
Voters turned down requests for approval of additional
operating levies – even though the school tax rates in
the South-Western City School District have always
been very low in comparison with other districts in
Franklin County.

A crowning achievement of the district was the
opening, during the 1970-1971 school year, of two
new high schools: Westland High School and Grove
City High School.
These two buildings, planned to house two
thousand students, were built in 1970-1971 at the
amazing low cost of $18.98 per square foot, or a perpupil
cost of $1,700. These buildings were classed
by architects and educators as "ten years ahead of
the times."

To stem crisis-level overcrowding, in 1998 the
district's voters passed one of the largest school
construction bond issues in the history of Ohio.
The issue made way for the construction of four
intermediate schools (fifth and sixth grade buildings),
a middle school, an additional high school, and a
technical career center, as well as renovations to seven
existing schools.

The first of the construction projects began with
the renovations to the district's current high school
auditoriums and fine arts areas. Auditoriums received
substantial upgrades with new floor coverings,
seating, lighting, and sound systems; and music
education facilities were renovated and expanded.
Considerable work was also done to the high school
athletic facilities, with stadium expansions/upgrades,
and renovations as needed to gyms, locker rooms,
and weight-training facilities. All of the high school
athletic fields also benefited from new, high-efficiency
lighting.

The district's middle schools also saw significant
improvements to auditoriums in the summer of 1999,
with new seating, wall and floor coverings, lighting
and sound systems. Once described as "eyesores,"
the auditoriums became functional, welcoming spaces
for school and community use.
The first four of the seven planned schools
opened in January 2001, serving nearly 3,200
fifth and sixth grade students throughout the
district. The intermediate schools not only eased
the overcrowding at the elementary and middle
schools, but they became models of cost-effective and
efficient educational facilities. When the construction
accounts closed on the first four intermediate schools,
the completed projects were approximately $913,000
under their collective construction budgets. Not
only were the buildings under budget, their capacity
was increased by 100 students each in anticipation of
higher enrollments than originally expected.

In the summer of 2001, the Board of Education
dedicated Jackson Middle School. Jackson Middle
School replaced Park Street Middle School (formerly
known as the Jackson Township/Grove City High
School building). Since 1928 the Jackson Township/
Grove City High School building had been a fixture
on Park Street. In keeping with district expectations,
the project finished at more than $200,000 under
its construction budget, with a 100-student greater
capacity than originally planned.

The district's fourth high school, Central Crossing,
completed its first year of operation with just freshmen,
sophomores, and juniors in the school. Central
Crossing High School saw its first graduating class
in the Spring of 2004. The opening of the 272,000
square-foot, 1,800-student capacity school provided
much-needed space at Franklin Heights, Grove City,
and Westland High Schools, which had been critically overcrowded.

One of the unique community amenities provided
at Central Crossing High School is the Central
Crossing Branch of Southwest Public Libraries, which
is available to the community when school is not in
session.

The South-Western Career Academy also opened
in the fall of 2002. The full-service career/technical
school serves juniors and seniors from the South-
Western City School District, offering them a wide
array of traditional and non-traditional technical
courses. Career Academy students access stateof-
the-art programming and technology that helps
to prepare them for either a career or college. The
South-Western Career Academy is host to the nation's
first AAA Sales and Service Office located within a
school.

As a result of the well-managed construction projects,
taxpayers received one more building than anticipated.
From the savings realized from the preceding projects,
combined with interest earnings on investments, the
district had the resources to convert Paul C. Hayes
Technical School into an additional fifth and sixth
grade school, Hayes Intermediate School.
In 2009, the district closed two of its buildings -
Harrisburg Elementary School and Kingston School,
as part of its cost containment strategies.
Also in 2009, the Auditor of State's office conducted
a Performance Audit of the district. The district
continues to aggressively pursue the implementation
of the recommendations contained in the Performance
Audit. Strategies and timelines have been developed
to assist the district in this implementation process.

Schools
OLD ELEMENTARY SCHOOLS  
       1920	North Franklin Elementary School		 2016   
                1939	Harrisburg Elementary School	2009  
             1949	Kingston School	 	2009

Elementary

Intermediate

Middle

Secondary

Funding
SWCS has always had issues with funding.  While they passed a property-tax school levy on their third try in May 2005, a drop in funding from the state as well as other factors such as a spike in gas prices forced the school district to make more than 14 million dollars in reductions after passing the levy.  In November 2006 they attempted to pass another levy, a 1% income tax, it was defeated.  Fortunately, due to a relatively warm winter and several other items, they only needed to cut one million dollars out of the following year's budget.  They decided not to try to pass a levy in May 2007 in hopes that the state budget, re-done in summer of 2007, would provide more funding.  The district was again on the ballot November 2008 for additional operating expenses and an Ohio School Facilities Commission building project with the state offering nearly $206 million in tobacco settlement funds to the district and again this bond issue and levy was defeated and the Ohio School Facilities Commission Funding is no longer available.  The school board voted in February 2009 to cut all extra-curricular activities and high school busing as well as additional positions in order to shrink the district budget.  The district went back on the ballot for another operating levy in May 2009 and again in August 2009 in hopes to reinstate these programs.  Both attempts failed and the district started the 2009-2010 school year with no extra-curricular activities, high school busing, etc.

With a projected deficit for the 2009-2010 school year, another levy attempt was made for November 2009.  Known as Issue 47, it was the last attempt for increased tax revenues in calendar year 2010 and the possible reinstatement of some extra-curricular activities for the remainder of the 2009-2010 school year.  Without the passage of this levy, the district would not have been able to collect additional tax revenues in 2010 and would have continued to fall deeper into a deficit.  The issue passed with 19,579 (50.58%) for to 19,130 (49.42%) against via the preliminary count results.

The School Board members are:

David Donofrio
Cathy Johnson
Mindy Garverick
Robert Ragland
Lee Schreiner

External links 

Education in Franklin County, Ohio
School districts in Ohio